Patapius spinosus is a species of spiny-legged bug in the family Leptopodidae. It is found in Africa, Europe and Northern Asia (excluding China), North America, and South America.

References

Articles created by Qbugbot
Insects described in 1790
Leptopodidae